Iger is a surname. Notable people with the name include:

 Bob Iger (born 1951), American businessman, Chairman and CEO of The Walt Disney Company
 Fred Iger (1924–2015), American comic book publisher
 Jerry Iger (1903–1990), American cartoonist

See also
 Eisner & Iger, former comic book "packager"
 IGER, the Institute of Biological, Environmental and Rural Sciences